Lynn R. Webster (born November 10, 1950) is a pain researcher and physician. From 1990 to 2010, he headed Lifetree Pain Clinic with approximately 15 healthcare providers. In 2010, After the DEA raided his pain clinic he left clinical practice and worked for opioid manufacturers conducting clinical trials on so-called abuse deterrent formulations.

Dr. Webster received millions of dollars from drug companies to test so-called abuse deterrent opioids on young adults. He has studied the effects of opioids on sleep, the testing of new opioid formulations designed to deter misuse, and effective screening methods to prevent opioid misuse. His recent work includes evaluating drug induced respiratory depression to help clinicians understand safety boundaries when prescribing medications. He is also known for developing the Opioid Risk Tool (ORT) and for his public campaign to reduce overdose deaths  from prescription medications.  Webster is currently a Senior Fellow at the Center for U.S. Policy and CMO at PainScript. He is the former Vice President of Scientific Affairs at PRA Health Sciences.

In 2013, it was revealed that the Drug Enforcement Administration (DEA) had opened an investigation related to overdose deaths at the Lifetree Pain Clinic, beginning in 2010. Dr. Webster estimated that as many as 20 former patients of his clinic died of opioid overdoses. After nearly four years, the U.S. Attorney for the District of Utah declined to pursue charges, and the case was dropped.

As of 2018 he has been named as a defendant in more than 80 class action lawsuits along with pharmaceutical companies that manufactured opioids.

He featured prominently in the 2021 documentary film The Crime of the Century.

Education and training 
Webster received a doctorate of medicine from the University of Nebraska in 1976 and began an internship with the University of Utah Medical Center shortly thereafter.  At the end of his internship, he started a fellowship in the Division of Artificial Organs and the Department of Surgery at the same medical center. Webster later moved from his fellowship to complete a residency at the University's Department of Anesthesiology.  He is board certified in anesthesiology, pain medicine, and addiction medicine.

Organizations 

Once in practice, Webster co-founded Lifetree Clinical Research with Alice Jackson in 2003. Jackson and Webster developed the specialized clinic to provide drug development services, clinical trial management, and site services for the pharmaceutical and biotechnology industries. In 2010,  Lifetree Clinical Research merged with CRI Worldwide to create CRI Lifetree. On November 13, 2013, CRI Lifetree was acquired by PRA Health Sciences. Webster became Vice President of Scientific Affairs at PRA Health Sciences.

Webster was named a co-recipient of a National Institutes of Health research grant to conduct the first-ever genome-wide association study into the characteristics of patients who developed addiction after being treated with opioids for chronic noncancer pain. Webster served as a co-investigator of the study alongside research teams from the University of Pennsylvania and the University of Washington.

Webster also co-founded a non-profit organization, LifeSource, in 2006.  The organization's goal was to educate physicians and patients on how to more safely prescribe opioids while funding and conducting research to find solutions for pain-related social and scientific issues. For the next six years, LifeSource worked within the pain community on the “Zero Unintentional Deaths” project. Their goal was to eliminate overdose deaths from prescription opioids. The LifeSource organization closed in 2012 to re-direct support to the American Academy of Pain Medicine Foundation (AAPMF). Webster is a past President of the American Academy of Pain Medicine (AAPM). The two organizations are heavily subsidized by  pharmaceutical companies.

Publications 

Webster's work was first published in 1978 by the Southern Medical Journal. He worked with four other medical professionals to publish the article, "Plasma cortisol and antidiuretic hormone concentrations after artificial heart implantation.”  Since then, Webster's work has appeared in more than 300 scientific abstracts and journals.  In 2007, he published the book, Avoiding Opioid Abuse While Managing Pain: A Guide for Practitioners.

In December 2016, he wrote The Painful Truth: What Chronic Pain Is Really Like and Why It Matters to Each of Us. He was also the co-producer of an accompanying TV documentary called The Painful Truth, distributed by NETA (National Educational Telecommunications Association) to National Public television stations in 2017. Webster also co-produced a version of the documentary called It Hurts Until You Die for film festivals.

He has been a columnist for The Hill (2016-2019), Pain News Network (2019-present), and Pain Medical News (2012–present).

Selected publications

Recent awards 

 Mayday Fellowship, Awarded by the American Academy of Pain Medicine in August 2010. 
 “Presidential Excellence Award for Education], Awarded by the American Academy of Pain Medicine on February 25, 2012
 His documentary, "It Hurts Until You Die," won an Impacs Docs Award in 2017.

References 

1950 births
Living people
American pain physicians
American medical researchers